Lopao'o Natanielu Mua is a Samoan politician and former Cabinet Minister. He is a member of the Human Rights Protection Party. 

Lopao'o grew up in a family of farmers and worked in farming and civil construction projects in both Samoa and New Zealand. He holds a degree in law from the University of the South Pacific and a degree in advance parliamentary governance from McGill University in Canada.

He was first elected to the Legislative Assembly of Samoa in the 2016 Samoan general election. He was appointed to Cabinet as Minister of Agriculture, Fisheries and Scientific Research in September 2017, replacing Laauli Leuatea Polataivao. As minister of agriculture and fisheries Lopao'o proposed to stop the sale of fresh coconuts to Samoa as a way to encourage farmers to meet the growing demand for copra. During the 2020 COVID-19 pandemic, Lopao'o choose to keep importing food from China, as other countries in the region halted all trade with China in an effort to stall the spread of the virus.

He is married to Siaumau and they have eight children.  He is a Lay Preacher and a member of the Methodist Standing Committee Board.

He lost his seat in the 2021 Samoan general election.

References

Living people
People from Vaisigano
Human Rights Protection Party politicians
Members of the Legislative Assembly of Samoa
Government ministers of Samoa
Samoan Methodists
University of the South Pacific alumni
McGill University alumni
Year of birth missing (living people)